Tokyo Tapes is the first live album by German rock band Scorpions and their last release by RCA Records. It was also the final release to feature Uli Jon Roth, who left after the 27 April taping session.

Tokyo Tapes includes songs from all Scorpions' albums released before 1978, which were recorded at Nakano Sun Plaza (Tokyo's Nakano Ward, Japan) on 24 and 27 April, during the band's Japanese tour in 1978. These shows were guitarist Uli Jon Roth's last performances with the band, who had announced his departure after the release of the studio album Taken by Force.

The songs "Hell-Cat", "Catch Your Train" and the Japanese national anthem ("Kimi ga yo") were also performed during these shows but were not included in the official album. On the 2001 EMI re-mastered CD, "Polar Nights" was omitted so as to fit a single CD, although it was included on the re-mastered version of Taken by Force. The earlier two-CD release, however, is the original album in its entirety. The original release was on 15 August 1978 in Japan only with cover artwork of an embossed platinum Scorpion on a rose as opposed to a live shot of the band when it was eventually released in Europe in December 1978. It was released in January 1979 in the U.S.A..

Roth commented about the recording of the album:
"Tokyo Tapes was a peak time, we have played together for all these years and it all came together at that time. Particularly on the first show, which unfortunately wasn't recorded. There were three shows in Tokyo, the first one was by far the best, but the second one was good too. Those are the ones on the album, the second and the third that were used. The first one I thought was a lot better and I was disappointed that it wasn't recorded."

In 2015, as part of Scorpions' 50th Anniversary, Tokyo Tapes was remastered and re-released, with all omitted songs restored ("Polar Nights" and the three songs excluded) and alternate version of several songs originally found on the album. Due to time constraints, "Robot Man", the last track of the original release, was shifted to the beginning of Disc 2 which otherwise contains bonus tracks).

Track listing 
Side one
 "All Night Long" (Uli Jon Roth, Klaus Meine)  – 3:44
 "Pictured Life" (Rudolf Schenker, Meine, Roth)  – 3:12
 "Backstage Queen" (R. Schenker, Meine)  – 3:44
 "Polar Nights" (Roth)  – 6:43 (omitted from single disc releases)
 "In Trance" (R. Schenker, Meine)  – 5:25

Side two
"We'll Burn the Sky" (R. Schenker, Monika Dannemann)  – 8:07
 "Suspender Love" (R. Schenker/Meine)  – 3:38
 "In Search of the Peace of Mind" (R. Schenker, Michael Schenker, Meine, Lothar Heimberg, Wolfgang Dziony)  – 3:02
 "Fly to the Rainbow" (M. Schenker, Roth)  – 9:39

Side three
 "He's a Woman, She's a Man" (R. Schenker, Meine, Herman Rarebell)  – 5:22
 "Speedy's Coming" (R. Schenker, Meine)  – 3:40
 "Top of the Bill" (R. Schenker, Meine)  – 6:45
 "Hound Dog" (Jerry Leiber, Mike Stoller)  – 1:14
 "Long Tall Sally" (Enotris Johnson, Robert "Bumps" Blackwell, Richard Penniman)  – 2:50

Side four
"Steamrock Fever" (R. Schenker, Meine)  – 3:41
 "Dark Lady" (Roth)  – 4:18
 "Kōjō no Tsuki" (Rentarō Taki, Bansui Doi, arr. Francis Buchholz, Meine, Rarebell, Roth, R. Schenker)  – 3:35
 "Robot Man" (R. Schenker, Meine)  – 5:47

2015 Remastered edition bonus tracks
"Hell Cat" (Roth) - 9:47 
 "Catch Your Train" (R. Schenker, Meine) - 3:52 
 "Kimi ga yo" (Yoshiisa Oku, Akimori Hayashi, Franz Eckert, arr. Scorpions) - 1:29 
 "Polar Nights" (Roth)  – 7:32 
 "He's a Woman, She's a Man" (R. Schenker, Meine, Rarebell)  – 6:06 
 "Top of the Bill" (R. Schenker, Meine)  – 10:48 
 "Robot Man" (R. Schenker, Meine)  – 6:49

Personnel 
Scorpions
 Klaus Meine – vocals
 Ulrich Roth – lead guitar, vocals on "Polar Nights", "Dark Lady", and "Hell Cat", storytelling in "Fly to the Rainbow"
 Rudolf Schenker – rhythm guitar, lead guitar on "He's a Woman - She's a Man" (only intro), 2nd solo on "Long Tall Sally"
 Francis Buchholz – bass guitar
 Herman Rarebell – drums

Production
Dieter Dierks – producer, mixing
Tamotsu Yoshida – live engineer

Charts

Certifications

References 

Scorpions (band) live albums
1978 albums
1978 live albums
Hard rock albums
Heavy metal albums
RCA Records live albums
Albums recorded at Nakano Sun Plaza
Albums produced by Dieter Dierks